Jean Mallot (born 20 August 1952 in Nizerolles, Allier) was a member of the National Assembly of France.  From the 2007 to the 2012 legislative elections, he represented the 3rd constituency of the Allier department, as a member of the Socialist Party. Major boundary changes in 2011 reduced Allier's parliamentary entitlement from 4 constituencies down to 3, and the old 3rd constituency was in effect abolished, its name and substantially its place being taken over by the pre-2012 4th constituency. Mallot chose to retire from the National Assembly at the June 2012 election.

He unsuccessfully contested Allier's 1st constituency as a miscellaneous left candidate in the 2022 French legislative election. He was eliminated in the first round coming in fifth place.

References

1952 births
Living people
People from Allier
Politicians from Auvergne-Rhône-Alpes
Socialist Party (France) politicians
Deputies of the 13th National Assembly of the French Fifth Republic
Candidates for the 2022 French legislative election